Moulana Syed Fida Hussain Bukhari is a Muslim Religious scholar and author. He studied under the guidance and supervision of grand Ayatollahs at the Hawza Ilmiyah Qom. His studies included Aloom-e-Kharij, Kalam, Falsafa and Fiqh. He first developed recognition as an independent writer and journalist; his writings have featured in the Daily Jang, Al Muntazar and Safeena-e-Nijaat Magazine. His writings led to his appointment as editor for the Quranic magazine Almizan. He has made appearances on radio stations and television broadcasts.

Television Programmes

Hidayat TV

 Practical laws of Islam
History of Islam
Istakhara from the Quran

Ahlebait TV
Sayings of the Prophet
Practical Laws of Islam
Istakhara from the Quran

DM Digital
Istakhara from the Quran

Books Written 
Flowers of Wisdom (Urdu: معرفت کی پول) published in 2009.

Living people
Shia scholars of Islam
Writers from Lahore
1961 births